Moturu Hanumantha Rao (1917-2001) was a Communist party leader in the state of Andhra Pradesh, South India. 

He was the founder-Editor of the Communist newspaper Prajasakti published from Vijayawada. Prajasakti was brought out as a daily under the leadership of P. Sundarayya and editorship of Moturu Hanumantha Rao on 1 August 1981, when the first issue was released by E. M. S. Namboodiripad.

(i) Madras Legislative Assembly and Andhra Pradesh Legislative Assembly, 1952–55, 

(ii) Andhra Pradesh Legislative Council, 1978–84 and 

(iii) Rajya Sabha, 3-4-1988 to 2-4-1994; Chairman, Department-related Parliamentary Standing
Committee on Industry, Rajya Sabha, 1993–94; 
Secretary, Andhra Pradesh State Committee of CPI (M), 1964–82; Author of a few books.

He died in 2001.

Notes

Indian publishers (people)
2001 deaths
Communist Party of India (Marxist) politicians from Andhra Pradesh
People from Guntur district
Members of the Andhra Pradesh Legislative Assembly
Rajya Sabha members from Andhra Pradesh
1917 births
Telugu politicians
20th-century publishers (people)
20th-century Indian businesspeople